Željko Ražnatović (17 April 1952 – 15 January 2000), better known as Arkan, was a Serbian mobster, politician, sports administrator, paramilitary commander and head of the Serb paramilitary force called the Serb Volunteer Guard during the Yugoslav Wars.

He was on Interpol's most wanted list in the 1970s and 1980s for robberies and murders committed in a number of countries across Europe, and was later indicted by the International Criminal Tribunal for the former Yugoslavia for crimes against humanity. Up until his assassination in January 2000, Ražnatović was the most powerful organized crime figure in the Balkans.

Early life
Željko Ražnatović was born in Brežice, a small border town in Lower Styria, PR Slovenia, FPR Yugoslavia. His father Veljko, was born in Rijeka Crnojevića near Cetinje, and had taken part in the Partisan liberation of Priština (Kosovo) during World War II. Later on, Veljko served as a decorated officer in the SFR-Yugoslav Air Force, being highly ranked for his notable involvement in World War II. Veljko was stationed in Slovenian Styria at the time when his fourth child Željko was born.

Infant Željko spent part of his childhood in Zagreb (SR Croatia) and Pančevo (SR Serbia), before his father's job eventually took the family to the Yugoslav capital of Belgrade (SR Serbia), which is considered his hometown. He grew up with three older sisters in a strict, militaristic patriarchal household with regular physical abuse from his father. In a 1991 interview he recalled: "He didn't really hit me in a classical sense, he'd basically grab me and slam me against the floor."

In his youth, Ražnatović aspired to become a pilot as his father had been. Due to the highly demanding and significant positions of his parents, there appeared to be very little time in which a bond was able to be established between parents and children. Ražnatović's parents eventually divorced during his teenage years.

Teenaged Ražnatović was arrested for the first time in 1966 for snatching women's purses around Tašmajdan Park, spending a year at a juvenile detention center not far from Belgrade. His father then sent him to the seaside town of Kotor (SR Montenegro) in order to join the Yugoslav Navy, but young Ražnatović had other plans (ending up in Paris at the age of fifteen). In 1969 he was arrested by French police and deported home, where he was sentenced to three years at the detention center in Valjevo for several burglaries. During this time he organized his own gang in the prison.

In his youth, Ražnatović was a ward of his father's friend, the Slovenian politician and Federal Minister of the Interior, Stane Dolanc. Dolanc was chief of the State Security Administration (UDBA) and a close associate of President Josip Broz Tito. Whenever Ražnatović was in trouble, Dolanc helped him, allegedly as a reward for his services to the UDBA, as seen in the escape from the Lugano prison in 1981. Dolanc is quoted as having said: "One Arkan is worth more than the whole UDBA."

Criminal career

Western Europe
In 1972, aged 20, Ražnatović migrated to Western Europe. Abroad, he was introduced to and kept contact with many well-known criminals from Yugoslavia, such as Ljuba Zemunac, Ranko Rubežić, Đorđe "Giška" Božović, Goran Vuković, etc., all of whom were also occasionally contracted by the UDBA, and all of whom were since assassinated or otherwise killed. Ražnatović took the nickname "Arkan" from one of his forged passports. On 28 December 1973, he was arrested in Belgium following a bank robbery, and was sentenced to ten years in prison.

Ražnatović managed to escape from the Verviers prison on 4 July 1979. Although he was apprehended in the Netherlands on 24 October 1979, the few months he was free were enough for at least two more armed robberies in Sweden and three more in the Netherlands. Serving a seven-year sentence at a prison in Amsterdam, Ražnatović pulled off another escape on 8 May 1981 after someone slipped him a gun. Wasting no time, more robberies followed, this time in West Germany, where after less than a month of freedom he was arrested in Frankfurt on 5 June 1981 following a jewellery store stickup. In the ensuing shootout with police he was lightly wounded, resulting in his placement in the prison hospital ward. Looser security allowed Ražnatović to escape again only four days later, on 9 June, supposedly by jumping from the window, beating up the first passerby and stealing his clothing before disappearing. His final European arrest occurred in Basel, Switzerland, during a routine traffic check on 15 February 1983. However, he managed to escape again within months, this time from Thorberg prison on 27 April.

It is widely speculated that Ražnatović was closely affiliated with the UDBA throughout his criminal career abroad. He had convictions or warrants in Belgium (bank robberies, prison escape), the Netherlands (armed robberies, prison escape), Sweden (twenty burglaries, seven bank robberies, prison escape, attempted murder), West Germany (armed robberies, prison escape), Austria, Switzerland (armed robberies, prison escape), and Italy.

Return to Yugoslavia
Ražnatović returned to Belgrade in May 1983, continuing his criminal career by managing a number of illegal activities. In November of that year, six months after his return, a bank in Zagreb was robbed with the thieves leaving a rose on the counter (allegedly Ražnatović's signature from his robberies in Western Europe). Looking to question Ražnatović about his whereabouts during the robbery, two policemen, members of the Secretariat of Internal Affairs' (SUP) Tenth department from the Belgrade municipality of Palilula, showed up in civilian clothing at his mother's apartment on 27 March Street in Belgrade. Ražnatović happened to not be home at the moment, so the policemen introduced themselves to his mother as "friends of her son looking to return a cash debt they owed him" and asked the woman if they could wait for him to return to the apartment. Ražnatović's mother phoned him to say that two unknown males waited for him. Ražnatović showed up with a revolver and proceeded to shoot and wound both policemen. He was detained immediately; however, barely 48 hours later, he was released. The occurrence made it clear to all observers, especially his criminal rivals, that he enjoyed protection from the highest echelons of the Yugoslav state security establishment.

Ražnatović spent the mid-1980s running the Amadeus discothèque together with Žika Živac and Tapi Malešević. Located in the Tašmajdan neighbourhood, the nightclub was reportedly another perk of their contractual work for the UDBA.

Moreover, Ražnatović could be seen driving around Belgrade in a pink Cadillac and gambling on roulette in casinos all over the country, from Belgrade (Hotel "Slavija") and nearby Pančevo to Sveti Stefan (Hotel Maestral on the Miločer beach) and Portorož (Hotel Metropol).

An avid gambler, following a private game of poker in an apartment at Ive Lole Ribara Street in Belgrade, Ražnatović got into an elevator altercation with a tenant from the apartment building, reportedly breaking the man's arm after beating him with a gun. Ražnatović could not avoid being charged this time and the trial saw a notable exchange between him and the judge; during the pre-session identification, Ražnatović stated he was an employee of the Secretariat of Internal Affairs (SUP). When this was challenged by the prosecutor, Ražnatović produced a document summarizing a mortgage loan he obtained from the UDBA for his house at Ljutice Bogdana Street. He ended up receiving a six-month sentence, which he served at the Belgrade Central Prison.

Yugoslav Wars

Early
Only days after the 1990 Croatian multi-party election, Ražnatović, who was the leader of the Delije (hooligan supporters of the football club Red Star Belgrade), was present at the away game against Croatian side Dinamo Zagreb at Stadion Maksimir on 13 May, a match that ended in the infamous Dinamo–Red Star riot. Ražnatović and the Delije, consisting of 1,500 people, were involved in a massive fight with the home team's football hooligans.

On 11 October 1990, as the political situation in Yugoslavia became tense, Ražnatović created a paramilitary group named the Serb Volunteer Guard (SDG). Ražnatović was the supreme commander of the unit, which was primarily made up of members of the Delije and his personal friends.

In late October 1990, Ražnatović traveled to Knin (in Croatia) to meet representatives of the Republic of Serbian Krajina, a Serb break-away region that sought to remain in FR Yugoslavia, as opposed to the Croatian government that seceded. On 29 November, Croatian police arrested him at the Croatian-Bosnian border crossing Dvor na Uni along with local Dušan Carić and Belgraders Dušan Bandić and Zoran Stevanović. Ražnatović's entourage was sent to Sisak and was charged with conspiracy to overthrow the newly formed Croatian state. Ražnatović was sentenced to twenty months in jail. He was released from Zagreb's Remetinec prison on 14 June 1991. It has been claimed that the Croatian and Serbian governments agreed on a DM1 million settlement for his release.

In July 1991, Ražnatović stayed for some time at the Cetinje monastery, with Metropolitan Amfilohije Radović. His group of men, fully armed, were allowed to enter the monastery, where they served as security. Ražnatović's group traveled from Cetinje to the Siege of Dubrovnik. On his return from Dubrovnik, he was again a guest at Cetinje.

War

The SDG (acronym for  – ), also known as "Arkan's Tigers", was organized as a paramilitary force supporting the Serb armies, set up in a former military facility in Erdut. The force, led by Ražnatović and Milorad Ulemek ("Legija"), consisted of a core of 200 men and perhaps totaled no more than 500 to 1,000, but was much feared by the public. Under Arkan's command the SDG massacred hundreds of people in eastern Croatia and Bosnia and Herzegovina. It saw action from mid-1991 until late 1995, and was supplied and equipped privately, by the reserves of the Serbian police force or through capturing enemy arms.

When the Croatian War of Independence broke out in 1991, the SDG was active in the Vukovar region, committing crimes against Croat and Hungarian civilians in Dalj, Erdut, Tenja and other areas. After the Bosnian War broke out in April 1992, the unit moved between the Croatian and Bosnian fronts, engaging in multiple instances of ethnic cleansing by killing and forcefully deporting mostly Bosniak civilians. In Croatia, it fought in various areas in SAO Eastern Slavonia, Baranja and Western Syrmia (Serbian Krajina). Ražnatović, reportedly, had a dispute over military operations with Krajina leader Milan Martić. In Bosnia, the SDG notably fought in battles in and around Zvornik, Bijeljina and Brčko, mostly against Bosniak and Bosnian Croat paramilitary groups, including killings of civilians.

In late 1995, Ražnatović's troops fought in the area of Banja Luka, Sanski Most and Prijedor. In October 1995, he left Sanski Most as the Army of the Republic of Bosnia and Herzegovina (ARBiH) reclaimed the city.

Ražnatović personally led most of the operations, and rewarded his most efficient officers and soldiers with ranks, medals and eventually looted goods. Several younger soldiers were rewarded for their actions in and around Kopački Rit and Bijelo Brdo. Ražnatović reportedly sent one of his most trusted men, Radovan Stanišić, to Italy to start a relationship with Camorra boss Francesco Schiavone. According to Roberto Saviano, Schiavone eased arms smuggling to Serbia by stopping the Albanian mobsters' blocking of weapons routes, and helped money transfer into Serbia in the form of humanitarian aid amid the international sanctions. In exchange, the Camorra acquired companies, enterprises, shops and farms in Serbia at optimal prices.

Ražnatović has been accused of kidnapping Serb refugees who had fled to Serbia from Croatia and Bosnia and Herzegovina and forcing them into conscription. After Operation Storm in Croatia resulted in the collapse of the Republic of Serbian Krajina (RSK) and exodus of Serb refugees fleeing to Serbia, the Serbian Interior Ministry rounded up over 5,000 refugees to conscript into the Serb Volunteer Guard (SDG). Military-aged men were forcibly rounded up after arriving in Serbia by local police and then sent to detention camp in Erdut against their will and without informing their families. Once in Erdut, the refugees' heads were shaved and all valuables were confiscated. The men were then subjected to days of physical and psychological torture from the SDG guards, which included extreme physical exercises, routine beatings, and often being subjected to humiliating acts. Ražnatović had been giving speeches accusing the refugees of being cowards and traitors, blaming them for the loss of RSK. Belgrade's Humanitarian Law Center has represented over 100 people suing the state of Serbia for forced mobilisation.

Post-war fame
Ražnatović came to serve as a popular icon for both Serbs and their enemies. For some Serbs he was a patriot and folk hero, while serving as an object of hatred and fear to Croats and Bosniaks.

In the postwar period after the Dayton agreement was signed, Ražnatović returned to his interests in sport and private business. The SDG was officially disbanded in April 1996, with the threat of being reactivated in case of war. In June of that year he took over a second division soccer team, FK Obilić, which he soon turned into a top caliber club, even winning the 1997–98 Yugoslav league championship.

According to Franklin Foer, in his book How Soccer Explains the World, Ražnatović threatened players on opposing teams if they scored against Obilić. This threat was underlined by the thousands of SDG veterans that filled his team's home field, chanting threats, and on occasion pointing pistols at opposing players during matches. One player told the British football magazine FourFourTwo that he was locked in a garage when his team played Obilić. Europe's football governing body, the Union of European Football Associations (UEFA), considered prohibiting Obilić from participation in continental competitions because of its connections to Ražnatović. In response to this, Ražnatović stepped away from the position of president and gave his seat to his wife Svetlana. In a 2006 interview, Dragoslav Šekularac (who was coach of Obilić while Ražnatović was with the club) said claims that Ražnatović verbally and physically assaulted Obilić players were false. Ražnatović was a chairman of the Yugoslav Kickboxing Association.

Many of the former members of "Arkan Tigers" are prominent figures in Serbia, maintaining close ties between each other and with Russian nationalist organisations. Jugoslav Simić and Svetozar Pejović posed with Russian Night Wolves, Ceca (Arkan's widow) performed for Vladimir Putin during his visit in Serbia, Srđan Golubović is a popular trance performer known as "DJ Max" and was identified by Rolling Stone as the SDG soldier kicking dead bodies of a Bosniak family in Bijeljina on a photo from 1992.

Kosovo War and NATO bombing

According to chief judge Richard May from the United Kingdom, the International Criminal Tribunal for the former Yugoslavia issued an indictment against Ražnatović on 30 September 1997 for war crimes of genocide or massacre against the Bosnian Muslim population, crimes against humanity and grave breaches of the Geneva Conventions. The warrant was not made public until 31 March 1999, a week after the NATO bombing of Yugoslavia had begun, as intervention in the Kosovo War (1998–99). Ražnatović's indictment was made public by the UN court's chief prosecutor Louise Arbour.

In the week before the start of NATO bombing, as the Rambouillet talks collapsed, Ražnatović appeared at the Hyatt hotel in Belgrade, where most Western journalists were staying, and ordered all of them to leave Serbia.

During the NATO bombing, Ražnatović denied the war crime charges against him in interviews he gave to foreign reporters. Ražnatović accused NATO of bombing civilians and creating refugees of all ethnicities, and stated that he would deploy his troops only in the case of a direct NATO ground invasion. After the U.S. bombing of the Chinese embassy in Belgrade, which killed three journalists and led to a diplomatic row between the United States and the People's Republic of China, the British Observer and Danish Politiken newspapers claimed the building might have been targeted because the office of the Chinese military attaché was being used by Ražnatović to communicate and transmit messages to his paramilitary group, the Tigers, in Kosovo. As neither paper offered any proof for this claim it was largely ignored by the media.

During an interview with Western journalists, while the three-month period of the NATO bombing was ongoing, Ražnatović showed a small rubber part of the F-117A downed by the Yugoslav army (one of only five NATO aircraft destroyed, on 38,000 sorties), which he had taken as "a souvenir"; Yugoslav media falsely proclaimed that Ražnatović had downed the stealth fighter.

ICTY indictment
In March 1999, the Prosecutor of the International Criminal Tribunal for the former Yugoslavia (ICTY) announced that Ražnatović had been indicted by the Tribunal, although the indictment was only made public after his assassination. According to the indictment, Ražnatović was to have been prosecuted on 24 charges of crimes against humanity (Art. 5 ICTY Statute), grave breaches of the Geneva Conventions (Art. 2 ICTY Statute) and violations of the laws of war (Art. 3 ICTY Statute), for the following acts:

Forcibly detaining approximately thirty Muslim Bosniak men, in an inadequately ventilated room of approximately five square metres in size.
Transporting twelve non-Serb men from Sanski Most to an isolated location in the village of Trnova and shooting them, killing eleven of the men and critically wounding the twelfth.
Transporting approximately sixty-seven Bosniak Muslim men from Sanski Most, Šehovci, and Pobriježe to an isolated location in the village of Sasina, and shooting them, killing sixty-five of the captives and wounding two survivors.
Forcibly detaining approximately thirty-five Muslim Bosnian men in an inadequately ventilated room of about five square metres in size, withholding from them food and water, resulting in the deaths of two men.

Assassination

Ražnatović was assassinated, on Saturday, 15 January 2000, 17:05 GMT, in the lobby of the New Belgrade's hotel Continental (or Intercontinental), in a location where he was surrounded by other hotel guests. The killer, Dobrosav Gavrić, a 23-year-old junior police mobile brigade member, had ties to the underworld and was on sick leave at the time. He walked up alone toward his target from behind. Ražnatović was sitting and chatting with two friends and, according to BBC Radio, was filling out a betting slip. Gavrić waited for a few minutes, calmly walked up behind the party, and rapidly fired a succession of bullets from his CZ-99 pistol. Ražnatović was hit in his left eye and became unconscious on the spot. His bodyguard Zvonko Mateović put him into a car, and rushed him to a hospital; he died on the way.

According to his widow Svetlana, Ražnatović died in her arms as they were driving to the hospital. His companions Milenko Mandić, a business manager, and Dragan Garić, a police inspector, were also shot dead by Gavrić, who in turn was shot and wounded by Mateović. A female bystander was also seriously wounded in the shootout. After complicated surgery, Gavrić survived, but was disabled from the waist down and confined to a wheelchair.

A memorial ceremony in Ražnatović's honour was held on 19 January 2000, with writer Branislav Crnčević, Yugoslav Left (JUL) official Aleksandar Vulin, singers Oliver Mandić, Toni Montano, and Zoran Kalezić, along with the entire first team of FK Obilić, including club director Dragoslav Šekularac, in attendance.

Željko Ražnatović was buried at the Belgrade New Cemetery with military honours by his volunteers and with funeral rites on 20 January 2000. Around 10,000 people attended the funeral.

Trials
Dobrosav Gavrić pleaded not guilty but was convicted and sentenced to 19 years in prison. His accomplices received from 3 to 15 years each, after a year-long trial in 2002. However, the district court verdict was overturned by the Supreme Court because of "lack of evidence and vagueness of the first trial process". A new trial was conducted in 2006, ending on 9 October 2006 with guilty verdicts upheld for Gavrić as well as his accomplices, Milan Đuričić and Dragan Nikolić. Gavrić was sentenced to 30 years in prison, as well as Milan Djurišić and Dragan Nikolić, for murder in complicity.

Prior to carrying out his sentence, however, Gavrić obtained a passport from Bosnia and Herzegonvina under the name Sasa Kovacevic and fled Serbia. In March 2011, he was driving a crime boss, Cyril Beeka, in Cape Town, South Africa when a gunman on a motorbike opened fire on them, killing Beeka and wounding Gavrić. Cocaine was found in the vehicle they were in, leading to Gavrić being fingerprinted and his true identity discovered. Since that time, he has been incarcerated in South Africa and fighting his extradition to Serbia where his 2006 sentence awaits him. , he is still fighting his extradition to Serbia in South African courts.

Personal life
Željko Ražnatović fathered nine children by five different women. His eldest son Mihajlo was born in Gothenburg, in 1975, from a relationship with a Swedish woman. In 1992, 17-year-old Mihajlo decided to move to Serbia to live with his father. During this time the teenager was photographed wearing the uniform of his father's paramilitary unit during the Yugoslav Wars and according to a Swedish tabloid report the youngster participated in combat operations in Srebrenica. Mihajlo has since lived in Belgrade where he played for the Red Star Belgrade ice-hockey club off and on between 2000 and 2009, also representing Serbia-Montenegro on the national team level between 2002 and 2004. During this time he also ran a sushi restaurant in Belgrade called Iki Bar and dated Macedonian pop singer Karolina Gočeva. He left Serbia after that. In 2013 he was in the news in Serbia again following the conclusion of a court case that had dragged on since 2005 over Ražnatović's failure to meet the repayment terms on a RSD1.1 million car loan he took out in 2002 from Komercijalna Banka. After continually failing to meet his monthly payments, the bank wanted the loan paid off in full in August 2005, and two years later took him to court. In June 2010 he was ordered to pay RSD3.3 million based upon the interest on the original loan. In the end, the verdict stated he owed the bank RSD2.9 million.

In June 1994, sometime after her separation from Željko Ražnatović, Natalija Martinović and their four children left Serbia and moved to Athens, Greece, where Željko bought them an apartment in the suburb of Glyfada. After his assassination, Martinović disputed his will, claiming that Svetlana Veličković, his second wife, doctored it. In May 2000, she sued Svetlana over Željko's assets, including the villa at Ljutice Bogdana Street in which he and Svetlana lived (and where Svetlana continues to reside), claiming it was built with funds from a bank loan Martinović and Ražnatović took out in 1985. The court eventually ruled against Martinović. The court agreed with her assertions that the villa was built with money from a 1985 bank loan taken out by her and Ražnatović, but ruled she had forfeited any rights in future division of that asset when she signed the property over to Ražnatović in 1994 before moving to Greece.

In 2012, Željko Ražnatović's son (by his first wife) Vojin Martinović – again accused Svetlana of falsifying his father's will. In response, Željko Ražnatović's former associate Borislav Pelević said that the villa at Ljutice Bogdana Street was not mentioned in the will as he had already signed it over to his second wife.

Arkan and Ceca have a daughter and a son.Their daughter Anastasija Ražnatović sings on her mother's label, and publishes the songs on YouTube.

In popular culture
History Channel's 2003 documentary Targeted includes a part on Željko Ražnatović, Baby Face Psycho.
In the 2008 Serbian film The Tour, a group of Serbian actors go on a tour in war-torn Bosnia. Among other factions, they meet an unnamed paramilitary unit wearing insignia similar to those of the Serb Volunteer Guard. Unit's commander (played by Sergej Trifunović) is possibly based on Željko Ražnatović.
In the 2014 Serbian docu-drama series Dosije: Beogradski klanovi, one of the episodes tells the story of Željko Ražnatović.
Jormugand character Dragan Nikolaevich is based on Željko Ražnatović.

References

Biographies

Interviews
Interview with Jim Laurie, 23 December 1991. 
Interview with local Bosnian Serb TV after takeover of Bijeljina, 1992.  
Interview with RTV BK, 20 July 1997.  
Interview with BBC, 1999.  
Interview with ABC, 6 April 1999. 
Interview with British reporter John Simpson, March 1999.  
Interview during NATO bombings, 1999.  
Interview with B92, April 1999.

Further reading

Todorovic, Alex, and Kevin Whitelaw. "A mobster, a robber, a Serbian hero." U.S. News & World Report 31 January 2000.

External links

'Arkan's Paramilitaries: Tigers Who Escaped Justice' – Balkan Insight, 8 December 2014
'Gangster's life of Serb warlord' – BBC News, 15 January 2000
'Arkan: Underworld boss of Milošević's murder squad' – The Guardian, 19 January 2000
'Blood and Honey – A Balkan War Journal' – NPR, February 2001
'Dosije Arkan'  – Vreme, November 2008

1952 births
2000 deaths
People from Brežice
Yugoslav criminals
Slovenian criminals
Serbian criminals
Male criminals
Serbian gangsters
Murdered Serbian gangsters
People murdered in Serbia
Party of Serbian Unity politicians
Members of the National Assembly (Serbia)
Candidates for President of Serbia
Serbian nationalists
Serbian soldiers
Serbian bank robbers
Security guards
Yugoslav secret police agents
Yugoslav escapees
Yugoslav people imprisoned abroad
Prisoners and detainees of Yugoslavia
People indicted by the International Criminal Tribunal for the former Yugoslavia
A
Military personnel of the Bosnian War
Military personnel of the Croatian War of Independence
Assassinated military personnel
Assassinated Serbian people
Assassinations in Serbia
2000 murders in Serbia
Deaths by firearm in Serbia
Burials at Belgrade New Cemetery
20th-century criminals
Serbian people of Montenegrin descent